Everything That Got Us Here  is the third studio album from American post hardcore band Secrets. It is the band's first release with unclean vocalist Wade Walters. The lead single, "Left Behind", was released on October 14, 2015.

Background
The band announced they had begun work on their third album in January 2015. At the same time, the band finished working on their acoustic EP Renditions. The band revealed they had recorded the entire album with new vocalist Wade Walters the same day they announced Aaron Melzer's departure.

Track listing

Personnel

Band
 Richard Rogers - lead clean vocals, rhythm guitar
 Michael Sherman - lead guitar
 Joe English - drums
 Wade Walters - bass, unclean vocals

Production
 Andrew Wade - vocal producer
 Tom Denney - producer
 Stephen Marro - additional production

Charts

References

2015 albums
Rise Records albums
Secrets (post-hardcore band) albums
Albums produced by Tom Denney